Garboldisham is a village and civil parish in the English county of Norfolk.

History
Garboldisham's name is of Anglo-Saxon origin and derives from the Old English for Gaerbald's homestead or village. Others argue it has a Viking origin with Garbold being a famous Viking. As described above, the boundary between Anglian, Viking and possibly even Iceni is blurred in the light of recent genetic and linguistic research. To the south of the village are the hamlets of Smallworth and Broomscot Common, the name of the latter according to some recalling the village's ancient pagan past, but more likely, so Carole Hough thinks, an affiliation to a Scandinavian with the surname Brun. This name might reflect the Viking invasions or Scandinavian connections of the Wuffingas, founders of the kingdom of East Anglia. It might even go further back in time if you believe theories that the pre-Roman Iceni inhabiting this area were Old English speakers rather than Cymric/Welsh.

There is a 10-foot high Bronze Age round barrow on Garboldisham Heath, known locally as 'Soldier's Hill' and 'Boadicea's Grave', although there is no evidence that Queen Boudicca is buried here. Local antiquarian Basil Brown carried out an excavation at the mound around 1963, and uncovered a burial urn, some cremated human bone, two flint flakes and a flint scraper. The burial probably dates from around 1300 BC.

In the Domesday Book, Garboldisham is listed as a settlement of 7 households in the hundred of Guiltcross. In 1086, the village was part of the East Anglian estates of King William I.

Garboldisham Hall was built in the early-Nineteenth Century by Sir George Gilbert Scott. In 1822, the hall was the birthplace of John Spencer-Churchill, 7th Duke of Marlborough and, subsequently demolished in 1952.

Geography
According to the 2011 Census, Garboldisham has a population of 969 residents living in 432 households.

Flordon falls within the constituency of South Norfolk and is represented at Parliament by Richard Bacon MP of the Conservative Party. For the purposes of local government, the parish falls within the district of South Norfolk.

Church of St. John the Baptist
Garboldisham's parish church dates from the mid-Fifteenth Century and is dedicated to Saint John the Baptist. The church holds a rare East Anglian example of a Galilee porch with the interior decoration largely the remnants of a Nineteenth Century restoration by James Powell and Sons.

Garboldisham also holds the ruins of All Saints' Church, which was abandoned in 1734 after the tower collapsed into the nave, and a Methodist Chapel on the southern side of the A1066.

Amenities
The village contains a Post Office with independent shop, selling a range of groceries as well as East Anglian regional "gourmet" produce. 

The majority of local children attend Garboldisham CofE Primary School which was rated by Ofsted as an 'Inadequate' school in 2019 and subsequently gained academy status and joined the St. Benet's Trust.

The Fox public house, on the crossroads of the A1066 and Hopton/Harling Road, closed in 2007 but was purchased by a village consortium in 2016 and reopened in December that year.

Garboldisham has active cricket teams.

In Popular Culture
The "Garboldisham Road" was mentioned in the A Bit of Fry and Laurie sketches "Information" and "Strawberries and Cream".

Notable Residents
 Crisp Molineux (1730-1792)- English politician
 John Spencer-Churchill, 7th Duke of Marlborough (1822-1883)- British politician and landowner
 Lt. Lord Alan Spencer-Churchill (1825-1873)- British Army officer and businessman
 Maj. Ernest Denny DSO (1872-1949)- English cricketer and British Army officer
 Lucinda Gooderham (b.1984)- former British rower

War Memorial
Garboldisham's war memorial takes the form of an stone octagonal shaft on a two-stepped plinth topped with a cross adorned with a carving depicting Saint George and the Dragon, located at the junction of Manor and Church Road. The memorial lists the following names for the First World War:

 Maj. George F. Molineux-Montgomerie (1869-1915), 3rd Bn., Grenadier Guards
 Capt. Wilfred G. Flack (1889-1917), 1st Bn., Royal Fusiliers
 Lt. Arthur L. Kennaway (1881-1915), 1st Sqdn., Queen's Own Dorset Yeomanry
 2Lt. Thomas R. Pollard (1891-1918), 5th Bn., Lincolnshire Regiment
 Cpl. F. C. Lince (1886-1919), G Coy., Royal Engineers
 Pvt. James Anness (1887-1915), 1st Bn., Essex Regiment
 Pvt. A. G. Garnham (d.1918), 2/8th Bn., Lancashire Fusiliers
 Pvt. Sidney W. Shearing (1897-1917), 1st Bn., Royal Norfolk Regiment
 Pvt. Thomas C. Chaplin (1890-1916), 8th Bn., Royal Norfolk Regt.
 Pvt. Arthur Brock (1896-1916), 8th Bn., Royal Norfolk Regt.
 Pvt. Herbert G. Reeve (1897-1916), 8th Bn., Royal Norfolk Regt.
 Pvt. Samuel L. Langley (1896-1916), 2nd Bn., Suffolk Regiment
 A. C. Atkins
 W. Chapman
 F. Claxton
 A. Reeve
 J. Reeve
 R. D. Smith

And, the following for the Second World War:
 L-Cpl. Walter C. Hurrell (1919-1944), 2nd Bn., Royal Norfolk Regt.
 S. M. Newton

References

 
Villages in Norfolk
Civil parishes in Norfolk
Breckland District